|}

The Lenebane Stakes is a Listed flat horse race in Ireland open to thoroughbreds three-year-olds and older. It is run at Roscommon over a distance of 1 mile 3 furlongs and 175 yards (2,373 metres), and it is scheduled to take place each year on Ladies Day, the first day of Roscommon's July meeting. It is Roscommon's most prestigious flat race.

History
The name Lenebane is derived from the townland in which Roscommon Racecourse is situated. The race was first run in 2006 and was given Listed status. It was originally contested over 10 furlongs, being lengthened to 12 furlongs the subsequent year. It has been run over this distance ever since.

Records

Leading jockey (3 wins):
Chris Hayes – Panama Hat (2015), Kalaxana (2018), Layfayette (2021)

Leading trainer (6 wins):
 John Oxx  – Raydiya (2008), Alaivan (2009), Karasiyra (2010), Aklan (2012), Red Stars (2016), Flying Faries (2017)

Winners

See also
 Horse racing in Ireland
 List of Irish flat horse races

References
 Racing Post:

 pedigreequery.com – Lenebane Stakes – Roscommon.

Flat races in Ireland
Open middle distance horse races